Mitchell Johnson is an Australian former cricketer. It may also refer to:

Mitchell Scott Johnson (born 1984), one of the juvenile perpetrators of the Westside School shooting
Mitch Johnson (born 1942), American football player
Paperboy (rapper) (Mitchell Charles Johnson, born 1969), American rapper

See also 
 List of people with surname Johnson
 Mitchell (given name)